The Praga V3S is an all-terrain multi-purpose truck, produced between 1953 and 1990 in Czechoslovakia. It was designed for the armed forces and was also exported to 72 countries. Praga produced the truck until 1964, then the Avia company till around 1986, after which the Bratislava company BAZ rolled out these vehicles till 1990. Around 130,000 units were manufactured. The truck was among the best off-road cargo vehicles of its time and the Czechoslovak Army used it for more than half a century. It was the longest produced Czechoslovak truck.

Development
For the development till prototype stage of the truck, designers were given only four months. They were inspired mainly by the American Studebaker US6 and Russian ZiL. The V3S was a durable, popular and extremely adaptable truck built in various versions and widely exported, therefore it is not difficult to see V3S based vehicles still hard at work nowadays.

Description
The engine is an air-cooled diesel six-cylinder "Tatra 912-1" (modified engine from Tatra 111), with a capacity of 7412 cm³, direct fuel injection and overhead valves. It is relatively noisy, but works reliably even in extreme conditions. Climbing ability is up to 75% (without tow). Ten wheels (rear are four dual, front are two) help the truck not to bog down in soft soil, therefore it does not experience any problems in forests or in the  field. Consumption is 30 liters of diesel per 100 km, the fuel tank has a capacity of 120 liters. The truck is able to get over 40 cm high perpendicular obstacle, wading depth is 80 cm. There are two batteries (12 V, 125 Ah), they connected in parallel during traffic, but serially when engine starts. The payload of the truck is 5 tons on paved surfaces and 3 tons on rough terrain.

Users

Former users

Images

References

Military trucks
Military trucks of Czechoslovakia
Cars of the Czech Republic
Praga vehicles
Military vehicles introduced in the 1950s